Rijal Almaa or Rijal Almaa (رجال ألمع) is a village located in the Rijal Almaa province, 'Asir Region, Saudi Arabia. The village is more than 900 years old. The village had an ideal location through which it linked the people coming from Yemen and the Levant through the Holy City of Makkah and Medina. As a result, it became a regional trade center.

Rijal Almaa contains around 60 multi-story buildings made of stone, clay and wood. The village has historical significance as it has a number of long and old fortresses. As the village is open for visitors, people can reach the place through a number of ways including Sawda center, Aqabat Sama, Muhayil Asir and Hobail.

Description 
The village includes several buildings, which consist of several floors, some reaching eight floors, they were made of stones and they also have colored wooden windows. They also contain inscriptions that appear on the interior walls of rooms. The art used in these inscriptions is known as the "Al-Qatt art", in which harmonious shapes and colors are usually placed by village women. In the outer courtyards of the houses, there are some wooden chairs and furnished mats, with shapes colored in green, white, yellow, and red, also present on the windows and wooden doors.

The Museum 
In the middle of the village, there is a museum called the “Men of the Brightest Heritage Museum”, which takes the Al Al-wan Palace as its headquarters it was chosen because it includes several floors and its construction dates back to more than four centuries, and the palace has gone through renovation works in which the villagers participated in. The museum displays the village's unique heritage, antiquities, and collections of manuscripts, tools, and weapons, as it houses more than two thousand antiquities and documents distributed in nineteen sections of the museum.

Wadi Hali dam
Wadi Hali dam is located in the north of the village. The area has many traditional houses.

21st century developments
In 2015, a rehabilitation project was undertaken by The Saudi Commission for Tourism and Antiquities in collaboration with the private sector. Moreover, a museum was established by the local people in one of the village's forts in 1985.

In 2017, the village was awarded the prize of Prince Sultan bin Salman for Urban Heritage. In January 2018, the Saudi Commission for Tourism and National Heritage (SCTH) has given Rijal Almaa the right to file for the UNESCO World Heritage Center.

References 

Tourist attractions in Saudi Arabia
'Asir Province
Archaeology of Saudi Arabia
fr:Rijal Almaa